Global Pink Hijab Day was an initiative that began as an experiment by founder, Hend El-Buri and a group of high school students in Columbia, Missouri. It was intended to remove stereotypes of Muslim women by having Muslims engage in dialogue about breast cancer awareness, joining walks in groups while wearing pink headscarves, and holding other events promoting awareness and support for the cause. Global Pink Hijab Day was last celebrated in 2011.

Global Pink Hijab Day was a global movement, with many participants including men who wear pink kufis (or skull caps) to celebrate breast cancer awareness. It took place at many Islamic schools and student organizations throughout the United States.

History 
Pink Hijab Day was founded in 2004 by Hend El Buri, a high school student at the time. It began small, in a high school in Columbia, MO. A group of girls decided to wear pink hijabs one day to encourage others to ask questions about their hijabs and about Islam. After more and more people began participating, the Susan G. Komen Foundation was contacted and Pink Hijab Day was held. The girls felt that wearing pink might lessen the tension of how people view Muslim girls wearing the Hijab, or headscarf. The creators of this event hoped that Pink Hijab Day would encourage people who are curious about women in Islam and hijab to ask questions to dispel misconceptions. They also promoted taking preventative action against Breast Cancer and to donate to various Breast Cancer Foundations to find a cure.

Previous Dates 

 Wednesday, October 29, 2008
 Wednesday, October 28, 2009
 Wednesday, October 27, 2010
 Wednesday, October 26, 2011

Purpose 
The purpose of Pink Hijab Day was threefold:

 Hijab – To encourage those who are curious about Muslim women and about hijab to ask Muslim women about what their hijab means
 Society – To encourage Muslim women to participate in various community improvement projects.
 Health – To raise funds for cancer research, and to encourage all people to maintain their health by getting regular screenings and to increase knowledge about preventative methods.

Observance 
Although it started in small college town Columbia, Missouri, Pink Hijab Day grew to be a worldwide day supporting and raising funds and awareness for breast cancer. Pink Hijab Day events are held in countries like Australia, Bulgaria, Canada, and South Africa, as well as States across America.

Inspired by the Pink Hijab Day movement the Muslim Southern Belle Charities Incorporated began participating in 2007. Muslim Southern Belle Charities relocated from Lexington, KY to Houston, TX in 2015 and held their first Pink Hijab Day event at Al-Ansaar Masjid in the Woodlands, TX in 2016. The event encouraged to wear a pink hijab and encouraged those in attendance to make a donation to Assalam Clinic at the Al-Salaam mosque to help pay for female medical screenings. Entertainment consisted of the Muslim Southern Belle version of the Hijabi Monologues to instill women empowerment through storytelling. The Monologues "allowed for many to start a dialogue when they had felt in the past their voices would not be heard". A hijab swap to benefit the Muslim Southern Belle Charities Incorporated Revert Closet; a project to benefit new Muslim reverts find the items they need to pray, visit the masjid and have a more modest wardrobe.

In 2017, The Muslim Southern Belle Charities Incorporated once again raised funds for the Assalam Clinic towards their Well Women's Clinic at a local coffee shop.  It was an exciting night with speakers, henna, face painting, and a huge silent auction. Speakers included Chrystal Said, the founder and president of Muslim Southern Belle Charities incorporated, a breast cancer survivor and a local OB/GYN. After the speakers guests were entertained with a henna artist, face painting, and a huge silent auction. The auction included art, gift certificates, scarves, baby attire, hair straighteners from Farouk Systems, spa day, luxury nail basket, Pampered Chef gift box, babysitting, sunglasses and jewelry.

Muslim Southern Belle Charities Incorporated plans to continued to participate in Pink Hijab Day and bring greater awareness to the Muslim Community about breast cancer and ways to help.

References 

Official Website Pink Hijab Day Website
Toronto Star article Toronto Star Newspaper. Mon Oct 15 2007
blog post  We Love Hijab
Pink Hijab Day Page Susan G. Komen. 2009
Thaqalayn Muslim Association of York University
[http://fatcatwebproductions.com/ThePaper_2014/md-thenews/content/pink-hijabis-breast-cancer-awareness
[http://fatcatwebproductions.com/ThePaper_2014/md-thenews/content/second-annual-pink-hijab-day-houston-success

External links 
Official Website

Breast cancer
Islam in Missouri
Health awareness days
October observances